is a Japanese women's professional shogi player ranked 1-dan.

Early life
Iino was born on November 17, 1986, in Setagaya, Tokyo. Since her father  was a shogi professional, she was first exposed to the game at a very young age and grew up in a shogi environment. Even so, she only really decided to pursue a career as a women's professional shogi player when she was second-year senior high school student.

In the Fall of 2005, Iino entered the Women's Apprentice Professional League under the guidance of her father, but was moved to Training Group Class D2 in April 2009 after the JSA ended the Women's Apprentice Professional League system at the end of March 2009. Iino was promoted to Training Group Class C1 in June 2013. This earned her the right to request to be promoted to the women's provisional shogi player status and the rank of 3-kyū. Iino submitted her request to the JSA, which announced a little over week later that it had been approved and that and she was to be officially awarded the rank and provisional women's professional status on October 1, 2013. In August 2013, however, Iinowho was still considered an amateurwon her preliminary group of the 7th . Her result meant that she not only advanced to the main tournament, but also that she satisfied the criteria for promotion to the rank of women's professional 1-kyū. The JSA announced a few days later on August 19, 2013, that Iino would be officially awarded the rank of women's professional 2-kyū and regular women's professional status on October 1, 2013.

Promotion history
Iino's promotion history is as follows:
 2-kyū: October 1, 2013
 1-kyū: May 9, 2014
 1-dan: April 1, 2018

Note: All ranks are women's professional ranks.

References

External links
 Japan Shogi Association official profile page 
 ShogiHub: Iino, Ai

Japanese shogi players
Living people
Women's professional shogi players
Professional shogi players from Tokyo
People from Setagaya
1986 births